The Eastern Continental Divide, Eastern Divide or Appalachian Divide is a hydrographic divide in eastern North America that separates the easterly Atlantic Seaboard watershed from the westerly Gulf of Mexico watershed.  The divide nearly spans the United States from south of Lake Ontario through the Florida peninsula, and consists of raised terrain including the Appalachian Mountains to the north, the southern Piedmont Plateau and lowland ridges in the Atlantic Coastal Plain to the south. Water including rainfall and snowfall, lakes, streams and rivers on the eastern/southern side of the divide drains to the Atlantic Ocean; water on the western/northern side of the divide drains to the Gulf of Mexico.  The ECD is one of six continental hydrographic divides of North America which define several drainage basins, each of which drains to a particular body of water.



Course
The Eastern Triple Divide is the northern terminus of the Eastern Continental Divide where it intersects the northeasterly St. Lawrence Divide near the middle of the northern border of Pennsylvania. That point divides the eastern United States into three watersheds, where the associated nearby headwaters form the Pine Creek tributary of West Branch Susquehanna River that drains to the Atlantic ocean, the Allegheny River tributary of the Ohio River that drains to the Gulf of Mexico, and the Genesee River tributary of Lake Ontario that drains to the Gulf of Saint Lawrence

The Eastern Continental Divide originates in the north at the Eastern Triple Divide in north-central Pennsylvania on the summit named 'Triple Divide Peak', 10.4 mi (16.7 km) south of the New York-Pennsylvania line, about 5 mi. southwest of the borough of Ulysses in Potter County, Pennsylvania.  The divide passes through the broader Allegheny Plateau region, following the boundary between the Allegheny River and Susquehanna River watersheds through most of Pennsylvania.  At Blue Knob near Altoona, the Divide begins to follow Allegheny Mountain and then Little Savage Mountain.  A few miles before the state border, the Divide begins to separate the Youghiogheny River and Potomac River watersheds.

In Maryland, the Divide runs significantly west of the Allegheny Front, following Backbone Mountain, and passing near the source of the North Branch Potomac River at the Fairfax Stone.  The Divide then passes through a plateau of the Allegheny Mountains of West Virginia, passing between the north end of the Canaan Valley in the Cheat River watershed, and the Mount Storm Lake basin in the Potomac River watershed.  The Divide then rejoins the Allegheny Front.

A significant portion of the Divide forms part of the border between West Virginia and Virginia along Allegheny Mountain and then Peters Mountain, separating the Greenbrier River and James River watersheds.  It then makes a dramatic arc to the east around the Sinking Creek valley, and then follows the hill crest east of Blacksburg, Virginia, until it meets the Blue Ridge Mountains, which take the form of an escarpment separating the headwaters of the New River from that of the Roanoke River.

Just before the Divide passes into North Carolina, it begins to separate the New River and Yadkin River watersheds.  It then separates upper tributaries of the Tennessee River from those of the Santee River.  Its high point is on Grandfather Mountain at 6,366 ft (1,940 m); although Mount Mitchell is the highest point in the Appalachian Mountains, it is not on the Divide, but 4 miles west of it.

In Georgia, the Divide generally separates the Apalachicola River watershed in the west from the Savannah River and Altamaha River watersheds to the east, passing through the Atlanta metropolitan area and extending past the southern end of the Appalachian Mountains southeasterly across the Georgia plateau.  This marks the first time the western watershed drains directly to the Gulf of Mexico without reaching the Ohio River first.  In southern Georgia, it separates the Suwannee River and Satilla River watersheds.

The Lake Okeechobee drainage basin in south central Florida, including the Kissimmee River drainage basin to the north which feeds it, was naturally or hydrographically, an endorheic basin, one which does not have outflow to another body of water like a river or ocean. Such a basin may form a swamp when water collects. It was altered by anthropogenic activity, specifically the construction of the Okeechobee canal in 1937 which spanned the Atlantic Ocean, the lake and the Gulf of Mexico. Nonetheless, it is not considered by hydrologists to be part of either the Gulf of Mexico watershed or Atlantic seaboard watershed. The northern boundary of the basin is the southern terminus of the Eastern Continental divide. 
In Florida, the Divide generally follows the western edge of the St. Johns River, meandering into the low country of Northern Florida until it reaches central Florida, ending at the north bank watershed of the Kissimmee River at the northern boundary of the Lake Okeechobee Basin(see sidebar).  While notionally, the ECD may be considered to extend to the southern tip of Florida, south of Lake Okeechobee the Everglades, which spans the length and breadth of the peninsula, is a seasonal swamp which drains into an unchannelled "river" 100 miles long and 60 miles wide that flows south to the Gulf of Mexico.

Though the divide is often associated with high elevation, at its southern terminus at the northern Kissimmee River watershed in Florida, the elevation is only 70ft. above sea level. Nor does the divide always coincide with the highest point or ridgeline, because streams can flow through passes or gaps in the ridge, so that terrain on one side of the ridge drains to the other side and therefore to the other watershed. This occurs in several places. The ECD is not completely fixed, but can shift due to erosion, tectonic shift and also anthropogenic activity such as tunnel excavation, damming of rivers and road construction.

Weather 
Because the divide is at or in proximity to the highest terrain, air is forced upwards regardless of wind direction. This process of orographic enhancement leads to higher precipitation than surrounding areas. In winter, the divide is often much snowier than surrounding areas, due to orographic enhancement and cooler temperatures with elevation.

History
Prior to about 1760, north of Spanish Florida, the Appalachian Divide represented the boundary between British and French colonial possessions in North America. 

The Royal Proclamation of 1763 separated settled lands of the Thirteen Colonies from lands north and west of it designated the Indian Reserve; the proclamation border ran along the Appalachian  Divide but extended beyond its Pennsylvania-New York terminus north into New England.

Locations

See also
Divides
 Continental Divide of the Americas
 Great Basin Divide
 Laurentian Divide
 Saint Lawrence River Divide

Notes

References

Geographic coordinate lists
Geography of the United States
Drainage divides
Drainage basins of North America
Appalachian Mountains
Hydrography